Christer Källén (13 September 1940 – 22 January 2019) was a Swedish curler.

In 1973 he was inducted into the Swedish Curling Hall of Fame.

Teams

Personal life
Christer's younger brother Claes is also a curler and his teammate.

References

External links
 
Jättebragden i Kanada största ögonblicket för 60-årsfirande Djursholms CK
Svensk Curling nr 2-3 2013 by Svenska Curlingförbundet - issuu
Christer Källén - Familjesidan

1940 births
2019 deaths
Swedish male curlers
Swedish curling champions
20th-century Swedish people